The Playhouse Theatre, originally known as the Hulme Hippodrome, was built in Hulme, Manchester, between 1901 and 1902 and opened on 6 October 1902. It and the nearby Grand Junction Theatre, built at the same time, were part of the theatrical empire of W. H. Broadhead. The two theatres were connected by an arcade, at the centre of which was Broadhead's company headquarters.

The Hippodrome presented mainly variety acts, while the Grand Junction concentrated on staging dramatic productions. In 1905 the names of the theatres were interchanged: the Hippodrome became the Grand Junction, and the variety performances were transferred to the new Hippodrome. Some time around 1929 the building was converted into a cinema, and was renamed the Junction Picture Theatre. It was sold in 1950 and converted back into a theatre, renamed The Playhouse. The first performance in the newly converted theatre took place on 22 January 1951, The Happiest Days of Your Life, a farce that had recently been made into a film. In 1956 the BBC bought The Playhouse as a production venue for radio and television shows, the first of which, a televised revue entitled Call It A Day, was broadcast in 1956. The last BBC production in the theatre took place on 25 August 1986. With funding provided by Manchester City Council and other groups, the building was subsequently bought and converted into an arts centre, now called the Nia Centre, which contains a 900-seat theatre.

See also

Listed buildings in Manchester-M15

References

Citations

Bibliography

Theatres in Manchester
1902 establishments in England
Grade II listed buildings in Manchester